Ferris Red Oak Muni Heliport  is a city-owned public heliport in  Ellis County, Texas, United States, serving the cities of Ferris, Texas and Red Oak, Texas. The heliport has no IATA or ICAO designation. The facility is alternatively known as the Ferris Red Oak Municipal Heliport.

The heliport is jointly owned by both cities, although the listed owner address is in Ferris, and it is maintained by City of Ferris Public Works.

The heliport is used solely for general aviation purposes.

Facilities 
Ferris Red Oak Muni has one helipad:
 H1: 40 x 40 ft. (12 x 12 m), Surface: Concrete

In the year ending September 29, 2015, the heliport had no based aircraft nor reported aircraft operations.

References

External links 
  at Texas DOT Airport Directory

Airports in Texas
Airports in the Dallas–Fort Worth metroplex
Transportation in Ellis County, Texas